The 1000 metres distance for men in the 2011–12 ISU Speed Skating World Cup was contested over seven races on six occasions, out of a total of seven World Cup occasions for the season, with the first occasion taking place in Chelyabinsk, Russia, on 18–20 November 2011, and the final occasion taking place in Berlin, Germany, on 9–11 March 2012.

Shani Davis of the United States won the cup, while the defending champion, Stefan Groothuis of the Netherlands, came second, and Kjeld Nuis, also of the Netherlands, came third.

Top three

Race medallists

Standings 
Standings as of 11 March 2012 (end of the season).

References 

Men 1000